Witów  is a village in the administrative district of Gmina Kościelisko, within Tatra County, Lesser Poland Voivodeship, in southern Poland, close to the border with Slovakia.

Location

The village has a population of 1,500.

References

Villages in Tatra County